Benjamin Hébert (born 19 February 1987) is a French professional golfer.

Early life
Hébert was born in Brive, France. His parents are Jean-Luc, a former pentathlete, and Françoise, a former swimmer, both of whom now work as teachers. He also has one sister, Audrey. Hébert spent some of his childhood in Tahiti, from age 14 to 18, before graduating from high school in 2005.

Amateur career
Hébert enjoyed a successful amateur career. He spent three years on the French national team, the highlight being representing his country at the 2008 Eisenhower Trophy. He won a number of individual tournaments, the most notable being the European Amateur in 2007, which gained him entry to the following year's Open Championship. He also represented Europe in the St Andrews Trophy.

Professional career
Hébert turned professional in 2009. He enjoyed immediate success on the Challenge Tour, recording a third-place finish in the Piemonte Open after receiving a special invite. He recorded his first professional victory on the third-level Alps Tour later in the summer, before earning a card for the European Tour at qualifying school at the end of the year. However, he struggled to settle at this level, making twelve cuts but not recording a single top-twenty finish, and he failed to retain his card. In July 2011, Hébert won his first tournament on the Challenge Tour at the Credit Suisse Challenge. He followed up with a second win a week later at the English Challenge. He won his third tournament of the year, the Rolex Trophy, in August to earn a promotion to the European Tour.

On the European Tour in 2012, Hébert finished in the top-10 once, T-6 at the Lyoness Open and finished 195th on the Race to Dubai, losing his tour card. He returned to the Challenge Tour in 2013 and 2014. In 2014, he won his fourth Challenge Tour event in August at the Norwegian Challenge, he soon followed this up with his second with of the 2014 season in September at the Open Blue Green Côtes d'Armor Bretagne. In the final event of the 2014 season at the Dubai Festival City Challenge Tour Grand Final, he secured his third Challenge Tour win of the season and 6th career win on the tour. In doing so Hébert finished second in the Challenge Tour Rankings behind Andrew Johnston, which earned him European Tour card for 2015 and became the first player to have three Challenge Tour wins in two separate seasons.

Since 2015 Hébert has played on the European Tour. He was runner-up in the 2018 Belgian Knockout where he lost to Adrián Otaegui in the final. He lost in a playoff for the 2019 Volvo China Open against Mikko Korhonen. He also lost in a playoff for the 2019 Aberdeen Standard Investments Scottish Open against Bernd Wiesberger.

Amateur wins
2006 Grand Prix de Niort
2007 European Amateur, La Coupe Mouchy (joint), Grand Prix de Bordeaux-Lac, Grand Prix Palmola, Grand Prix de Saint Cyprien

Professional wins (8)

Challenge Tour wins (6)

Alps Tour wins (1)

French Tour wins (1)

Playoff record
European Tour playoff record (0–3)

Results in major championships
Results not in chronological order in 2020.

CUT = missed the half-way cut
"T" = tied
NT = No tournament due to COVID-19 pandemic

Results in World Golf Championships

1Cancelled due to COVID-19 pandemic

NT = No tournament
"T" = Tied

Team appearances
Amateur
European Amateur Team Championship (representing France): 2008
Eisenhower Trophy (representing France): 2008
St Andrews Trophy (representing the Continent of Europe): 2008
Bonallack Trophy (representing Europe): 2008 (winners)
European Team Championships (representing France): 2008

See also
2009 European Tour Qualifying School graduates
2011 Challenge Tour graduates
2014 Challenge Tour graduates
List of golfers with most Challenge Tour wins
List of golfers to achieve a three-win promotion from the Challenge Tour

References

External links
 

French male golfers
European Tour golfers
Sportspeople from Corrèze
People from Brive-la-Gaillarde
People from Tahiti
1987 births
Living people
21st-century French people